Francisco Fernández de Cevallos y Urrueta (born 4 July 1947) is a Mexican politician affiliated with the National Action Party. He served as Senator of the LVIII and LIX Legislatures of the Mexican Congress representing Querétaro.

References

1947 births
Living people
Politicians from Querétaro
Members of the Senate of the Republic (Mexico)
National Action Party (Mexico) politicians
21st-century Mexican politicians
People from San Juan del Río
Autonomous University of Queretaro alumni